The Eddie Robinson Classic was a college football "kickoff" game played in late August from 1997 through 2002 at various sites. The game was named after legendary Grambling coach Eddie Robinson. Until 2002, the NCAA only allowed for teams to play a 12-game regular season schedule if the first game were a licensed Classic such as the Eddie Robinson Classic, the Pigskin Classic, or the Kickoff Classic. In 2002 the NCAA ended the allowance of an extra 12th game, thus effectively ending the Classics. Kickoff games would later see a revival in 2008, when the Chick-fil-A Kickoff Game was organized as a neutral-site game held in Atlanta, Georgia, followed by the Cowboys Classic in Arlington, Texas in 2009.

Game results

Rankings from AP Poll prior to game.

References 

College football kickoff games
Recurring sporting events established in 1997
Recurring sporting events disestablished in 2002